Matsuyama-Machi Station the name of two train stations in Japan:

Matsuyama-Machi Station (Miyagi), Miyagi Prefecture, on the Tōhoku Main Line
Matsuyama-Machi Station (Nagasaki), Nagasaki Prefecture, on the Nagasaki Electric Tramway